Filatima demissae is a moth of the family Gelechiidae. It is found in North America, where it has been recorded from California and Arizona.

References

Moths described in 1931
Filatima